(Sanskrit; Pali: Puṇṇa Mantānīputta), also simply known as Pūrṇa (Sanskrit; Pali: Puṇṇa), was an arhat and one of the ten principal disciples of Gautama Buddha, foremost in preaching the dharma.

Life 
Puṇṇa Mantānīputta was born in Donavatthu, near Kapilavatthu, in a family of brahmins. His mother was Mantānī (or Maitrāyanī), sister of Ven. Añña Koṇḍañña, who became Ven. Puṇṇa's teacher. Ven. Ānanda, after his first rain retreat, mentions him as a great influence in the Ānandasuttaṃ. He says that thanks to him he was able to become a sotāpanna.

Ven. Sāriputta hears about Ven. Puṇṇa for the first time through a conversation between the Tathāgata and a group of shakyans who praised him. Then Ven. Sāriputta has the chance to meet Ven. Puṇṇa at Sāvatthī, where he asks Ven. Puṇṇa about the dharma without revealing his identity. As part of his answer, Ven. Puṇṇa uses the analogy of the relay chariots in the Rathavīnitasuttaṃ. Then both reveal their names. Ven. Puṇṇa says he is called Puṇṇa, but known as Mantāniputta by his companions in the holy life, and Ven. Sāriputta says his name is Upatissa, but that he's known by his companions in the holy life as Sāriputta. They both praise one another.

References

Bibliography

External links
 "Punna" in the Buddhist Dictionary of Pali Proper Names.

Foremost disciples of Gautama Buddha
Arhats